Manuel José Blázquez López (born March 22, 1989 in Albacete, Castile-La Mancha, Spain), commonly known as Manolo Blázquez, is a Spanish basketball player who is best known for his time at the CB Lucentum Alicante of the Asociación de Clubs de Baloncesto (ACB).

He started to play in Escuelas Pías of Albacete. In 2005 he was signed by Alicante Costa Blanca to play in the junior team but in 2007 he began his professional career with Alicante Costa Blanca in the ACB league. Since 2008, he played for Liga EBA (4th division) teams as Meridiano Santa Pola, Adesavi San Vicente and La Roda Caja Rural, until he signed, in 2013, for Albacete Basket, returning to his native city.

In 2014, he started studying to become sports teacher in Alicante.

References

External links
 Manuel Blázquez official ACB player page
 Manuel Blázquez official FEB player page and Sub-20 Circuit Statistics

1989 births
Living people
CB Lucentum Alicante players
Liga ACB players
Spanish men's basketball players
Guards (basketball)